Cedarbrae can refer to:

Cedarbrae, Calgary, a neighbourhood in Calgary, Alberta, Canada
Cedarbrae, alternative name of Woburn, Toronto, a neighborhood in the Scarborough district of Toronto
Cedarbrae, alternative name of Bendale, a neighbourhood in Toronto, Ontario, Canada
Cedarbrae Collegiate Institute, a public high school in Toronto, Ontario, Canada
Cedarbrae Public School, a public elementary school in Waterloo, Ontario, Canada
Cedarbrae Mall, a shopping center in Toronto